Swinging, sometimes called wife-swapping, husband-swapping, or partner-swapping, is a sexual activity in which both singles and partners in a committed relationship sexually engage with others for recreational purposes. Swinging is a form of non-monogamy and is an open relationship. People may choose a swinging lifestyle for a variety of reasons. Practitioners cite an increased quality and quantity of sex. Some people may engage in swinging to add variety into their otherwise conventional sex-lives or due to their curiosity. Some couples see swinging as a healthy outlet and means to strengthen their relationship.

The phenomenon of swinging, or its wider discussion and practice, is regarded by some as arising from the freer attitudes to sexual activity after the sexual revolution of the 1960s, the invention and availability of the contraceptive pill, and the emergence of treatments for many of the sexually transmitted diseases that were known at that time. The adoption of safe sex practices became more common in the late 1980s. It is also a recurring theme in pornography. 

The swingers community sometimes refers to itself as "the lifestyle", or as "the alternative lifestyle".

Description

John Stossel produced an investigative news report into the swinging lifestyle. Stossel's report in 2005 cited Terry Gould's research, which concluded that "couples swing in order to not cheat on their partners". When Stossel asked swinging couples whether they worry their spouse will "find they like someone else better," one male replied, "People in the swinging community swing for a reason. They don't swing to go out and find a new wife;" a woman asserted, "It makes women more confident – that they are the ones in charge." Stossel interviewed 12 marriage counselors. According to Stossel, "not one of them said don't do it," though some said "getting sexual thrills outside of marriage can threaten a marriage". Swingers whom Stossel interviewed said "their marriages are stronger because they don't have affairs and they don't lie to each other."

Swinging can take place in a number of contexts, ranging from spontaneous sexual activity involving partner swapping or adding a third or more participants at an informal gathering of friends to planned regular social meetings to "hooking up" with like-minded people at a sex club (also known as a swinger club, not to be confused with a strip club). Different clubs offer varied facilities and atmospheres, and often hold "theme" nights.

Swinging is also known to take place in semi-public venues such as hotels, resorts, or cruise ships, or often in private homes. Furthermore, many websites that cater to swinging couples now exist, some boasting hundreds of thousands of members.

In 2018, a study of the prevalence of non-monogamous practices in the United States estimated that 2.35% of Americans currently self-identify as swingers and 4.76% had identified as swingers at some point in their lifetime.

Effects

Relationship quality 
Research on swinging has been conducted in the United States since the late 1960s. One 2000 study, based on an Internet questionnaire addressed to visitors of swinger-related sites, found swingers reported happiness is higher in their relationships than the norm-reported-happiness.

Sixty percent said that swinging improved their relationship; 1.7% said swinging made their relationship less happy. Approximately 50% of those who rated their relationship "very happy" before becoming swingers maintained their relationship had become happier. 90% of those with less happy relationships said swinging improved them. Almost 70% of swingers claimed no problem with jealousy; approximately 25% admitted "I have difficulty controlling jealousy when swinging" as "somewhat true", while 6% said this was "yes, very much" true. Swingers rate themselves happier ("very happy": 59% of swingers compared to 32% of non-swingers) and their lives more "exciting" (76% of swingers compared to 54% of non-swingers) than non-swingers, by significantly large margins. There was no significant difference between responses of men and women, although more males (70%) than females completed the survey. This study, which only polled self-identified swingers, is of limited use to a broader application to the rest of society (external validity) owing to self-selected sampling.

Some believe sexual attraction is part of human nature and should be openly enjoyed by a committed or married couple. Some swingers cite divorce-data in the US, claiming the lack of quality of sex and spousal infidelity are significant factors in divorce. One study showed 37% of husbands and 29% of wives admit at least one extramarital affair (Reinisch, 1990), and divorce-rates for first marriages approached 60%.

Sexually-transmitted infections
Swingers are exposed to the same types of risks as people who engage in casual sex, with the main concerns being the risk of pregnancy or contracting a sexually transmitted infection (STI). Some swingers engage in unprotected sex, a practice known as barebacking, while others follow safe sex practices and will not engage with others who do not also practice safe sex. In most swingers' clubs, condoms are freely available and sometimes the club may require their use. Swingers may reduce the risk of STI by exchanging STI test results and serosorting. Proponents of swinging argue that safe sex is accepted within the swinging community and the risk of sexual disease is the same for them as for the general population – and that some populations of sexually non-monogamous people have clearly lower rates of STIs than the general population. Opponents are also concerned about the risk of pregnancy and STIs such as HIV, arguing that even protected sex is risky given that some STIs may be spread regardless of the use of condoms, such as Herpes and HPV. In a 1992 study, an overall 7% of swingers had quit swinging because of the HIV/AIDS epidemic. It was also stated that 62% of swingers changed their sex practices, by becoming more selective with partners or by practicing safe sex.

A Dutch study that compared the medical records of self-reported swingers to that of the general population found that STI prevalence was highest in young people, homosexual men, and swingers. However, this study has been criticized as not being representative of swinger populations as a whole: its data was formulated solely on patients receiving treatment at an STI clinic. In addition, according to the conclusions of the report, the STI rates of swingers were in fact nearly identical to those of non-swinging straight couples, and concluded that the safest demographic for STI infection were female prostitutes. According to the Dutch study, "the combined rates of chlamydia and gonorrhea were just over 10% among straight people, 14% among gay men, just under 5% in female prostitutes, and 10.4% among swingers."

Pregnancy

Pregnancy is regarded as a possible undesirable consequence of engaging in swinging sexual activities. While this is also the same for monogamous sex, the risk of a woman being impregnated by a man other than her spouse or long-term partner adds a second layer of concern.

Proper use of a condom with an effective birth control method can minimize the risk of pregnancy and transmission of STIs while swinging. Other solutions include a tubal ligation (female sterilization), vasectomy (male sterilization), or having a group entirely made of menopausal women.

Couples in the lifestyle who wish to start families or have additional children are highly recommended to cease participation in swinging for at least several months prior to an intended pregnancy. This helps to ensure correct paternity for the future.

In North American society
According to Terry Gould's The Lifestyle: A look at the erotic rites of swingers, swinging began among American Air Force pilots and their wives during World War II before pilots left for overseas duty. The mortality rate of pilots was so high, as Gould reports, that a close bond arose between pilot families that implied that pilot husbands would care for all the wives as their own – emotionally and sexually – if the husbands were lost. The realities of the demographics and basing of US Army Air Force (USAAF) pilots and crew suggest that this arrangement did not evolve during WWII, instead evolving later. US military personnel in WWII were not accompanied by their families (and many, especially in the USAAF, were single) – the giant military bases where families live while accompanying a deployed soldier, sailor, aviator, or Marine are mostly Cold War creations. Though the origins of swinging are contested, it is assumed American swinging was practiced in some American military communities in the 1950s. By the time the Korean War ended, swinging had spread from the military to the suburbs. The media dubbed the phenomenon wife-swapping.

Later in the 1960s in the heyday of the Free Love movement, the activities associated with swinging became more widespread in a variety of social classes and age levels. In the 1970s, sometimes referred to as "The Swinging '70s", swinging activities became more prevalent, but were still considered "alternative" or "fringe" because of their association with non-mainstream groups such as communes.

Swinging activities had another surge in interest and participation in the late 1990s due to the rise of the Internet, and again during the 2010s with smartphone applications such as Tinder and Feeld.

In 2002, swingers’ rights were added to the mission of the [American] National Coalition for Sexual Freedom.

A 'key party' is a form of swinger party, in which male partners place their car or house keys into a common bowl or bag on arriving. At the end of the evening the female partners randomly select keys from the bowl and leave with that key's owner.

According to economic studies on swinging, the information and communications technology revolution, together with improvements in medicine, has been effective in reducing some of the costs of swinging and hence in increasing the number of swingers.

See also

 Candaulism
 Contact magazine
 Cuckold
 Cuckquean
 Gang bang
 Group sex
 Hedonism
 Human sexuality
 Libertine
 Meet market
 Open marriage
 Polyamory
 Polyfidelity
 Promiscuity

Notes

 
Group sex
Free sex
Sexual fidelity
Casual sex
Sexuality and gender identity-based cultures